The discography of the South Korean singer Key consists of two studio albums (one of which was re-released under a different title), two extended plays, one soundtrack album, eight singles (including three as featured artist) and three appearances on soundtracks.

Key made his debut as a solo artist on November 6, 2018, with the release of the single "Forever Yours". He released his first studio album, titled Face, on November 26, 2018, containing 10 songs in total, including the title track "One of Those Nights" and his first single "Forever Yours". On December 26, 2018, he released his first Japanese extended play, titled Hologram, containing a total of five tracks, including a Japanese version of "One of Those Nights". On February 14, 2019, he released the song "Cold" for the Station project. On March 4, Key released the repackaged album I Wanna Be.  On September 27, 2021, Key released his first Korean extended play Bad Love. On August 30, 2022, he released his second studio album Gasoline. The album's reissue, Killer, was released on February 13, 2023.

Albums

Studio albums

Reissues

Soundtrack albums

Extended plays

Singles

As lead artist

As featured artist

Collaborations

Soundtrack appearances

Music videos

Notes

References

External links 
  

Discographies of South Korean artists
K-pop discographies